"Non illuderti mai" ("Never Deceive Yourself") is a song by Italian singer Orietta Berti, released as a single in April 1968 for the summer festival Un disco per l'estate. The song came in second place at the festival behind "Luglio" by Riccardo Del Turco. It has notably been covered in English as "My Little Lady" by the Tremeloes and in French as "Ma bonne étoile" by Joe Dassin.

Track listing
7"
 "Non illuderti mai" – 2:27
 "Amore per la vita" – 2:43

Charts and certifications

Weekly charts

Year-end charts

Certifications

The Tremeloes version

British band the Tremeloes released an English-language version of the song in September 1968, with lyrics by band members Alan Blakely and Len "Chip" Hawkes. It became a top-ten hit in the UK.

Reception
Reviewing for Record Mirror, Peter Jones described "My Little Lady" as "a bouncy little song... with a very fine backing. It's all rather staccato and impressive in the way that it builds". For Melody Maker, Chris Welch wrote that "trumpets are also the standout feature of this bright and inventive arrangement that has the Infectious qualities of some French pop records". For New Musical Express, Derek Johnson described the song as "rich in appealing harmonies and the song itself is much in the style of "Suddenly You Love You", which also stemmed from Italian sources. The melody is catchy and quick to register, and I'm sure you're all be humming it".

Track listing
7"
 "My Little Lady" – 2:36
 "All the World to Me" – 2:40

Charts

Joe Dassin version

French singer-songwriter Joe Dassin released a French-language version of the song as a single in November 1968 from his album Joe Dassin (Les Champs-Élysées). It was adapted into French by Pierre Delanoë and featured an orchestra conducted by Johnny Arthey. It topped the charts in France for one week from 30 November to 6 December 1968. The B-side, "Un peu comme toi", is a French-language version of Johnny Nash's "Hold Me Tight".

Track listing
7"
 "Ma bonne étoile" – 2:37
 "Un peu comme toi" – 2:48

Charts

Weekly charts

Year-end charts

Other versions
 In 1968 the organist Dorsey Dodd records the instrumental version on the album Intimità (Intimacy) (Vedette Records, VPAS 874)
 In 1968, Anni-Frid Lyngstad released a Swedish-language version, titled "Mycket kär", as her fourth single.
 In 1968, Yugoslav band Sanjalice released a Croatian-language version, titled "Ta mala ledi", on their EP Marijana.
 In 1968, Finnish singer Johnny Liebkind released a Finnish-language version, titled "Tyttö niinkuin pitää", as a single, which peaked at number 6 on the Finnish Singles Chart.
 In 1969, French orchestra leader Caravelli covered "Ma bonne étoile" on his album Eloïse.
 In 1969, Italian singer Gigliola Cinquetti covered the song on her album Il treno dell'amore.
 In 1996, German band Die Flippers released a German-language version, titled "Mexican Lady", on their album Liebe ist...mein erster Gedanke.

References

1968 songs
1968 singles
Italian songs
Polydor Records singles
Songs written by Daniele Pace
Songs written by Mario Panzeri